Sergio Galdós and Marco Trungelliti were the defending champions, but Trungelliti decided not to compete. Galdós plays alongside Ariel Behar.

Roberto Maytin and Fernando Romboli won the title, defeating Hugo Dellien and Eduardo Schwank in the final, 6–3, 6–4.

Seeds

Draw

Draw

References
 Main Draw

Challenger ATP de Salinas Diario Expreso - Doubles
2014 Doubles